The Nooksack River is a river in western Whatcom County of the northwestern U.S. state of Washington, draining extensive valley systems within the North Cascades around Mount Shuksan, Mount Baker and the Twin Sisters, and a portion of Fraser Lowland south of the Canada–United States border.

The river proper begins with the merging of three main tributaries, namely the North Fork, Middle Fork and South Fork, near Deming. All three forks originate in the Mount Baker Wilderness, and the North Fork, the longest of the three, is sometimes considered the main river. The lower Nooksack flows as a northerly loop through the fertile southern Fraser Lowland agricultural area before emptying into Bellingham Bay and, via the Strait of Juan de Fuca and the Strait of Georgia, communicating with the Pacific Ocean.

Course

North Fork

The North Fork Nooksack River rises at the Nooksack Cirque east of Mount Shuksan within the western part of North Cascades National Park in central Whatcom County.  Gathering meltwater off East Nooksack Glacier, it flows generally west past north of Mount Baker. For most of its course, this fork is paralleled by State Route 542 (also called the Mount Baker Highway).  The river picks up large creeks such as Price Creek, a short creek draining Price Lake; as well as Ruth Creek, before the uppermost highway bridge crosses it.

At Nooksack Falls, the river flows through a narrow valley and drops freely  into a deep rocky river canyon. The falls are viewable from the forested cover near the cliff edge. A small parking lot nearby contains a kiosk with information about the falls and a hydroelectric project.

Continuing west, the North Fork receives several tributaries including Wells Creek, which joins the river at the base of the falls, and Glacier Creek and Canyon Creek, before the river turns briefly south.  The Middle Fork and South Fork join the North Fork within a few miles of one another.  The Middle Fork joins first, with its confluence opposite Welcome. The South Fork joins just southeast of Deming and the Nooksack Indian Reservation, creating the Nooksack River proper.

The traditional name of the North Fork in the Nooksack language is Chuw7álich ("the next point").

Middle Fork

The traditional name of the Middle Fork in the Nooksack language is Nuxwt’íqw’em ("always-murky water").

South Fork
It flows briefly south, entering Skagit County, then northwest to re-enter Whatcom County.

The traditional name of the South Fork in the Nooksack language is Nuxw7íyem ("always-clear water").

Nooksack proper

After the Middle and South Forks join, the combined river flows northwest, emerging from the valley south of the Sumas Mountain and flowing past Everson and Lynden. Near Everson, the river is at risk of floods breaching the right bank, allowing flow into lower lands to the north, through Sumas River and into Canada. At Lynden the river turns southwest and, near Ferndale, south.

River modifications
The river supplies the nearby town of Glacier, Washington with hydroelectric power from a dam on the North Fork near Nooksack Falls. The Middle Fork was partially blocked with a diversion dam built by the City of Bellingham in the late 1950s for diverting water into Lake Whatcom, which supplies the city's drinking water. As of July 2020, this old water diversion system has been modified to remove the dam and restore the river channel for the benefit of critical salmon spawning habitat.

In the late 19th century, most of the stream flow of the Nooksack River near its mouth flowed through the present channel of the short Lummi River to Lummi Bay, northwest of Bellingham Bay. Near the start of the 20th century, a log jam plugged the channel to Lummi Bay, forcing the river to change its channel to the present one. The accumulation of the new river delta has been an ongoing field of research regarding the new wetlands it has created. The river only resupplies the previous delta on Lummi Bay during high-flow conditions.

Floods

The river is subject to flooding due to high rainfall amounts in the region and some of the deepest snow packs in the country. The Pineapple Express, a weather pattern that brings central Pacific wind and rain to the northwest, can sometimes catalyze flooding. For example, flooding in Everson occurred 14 times from to 1936 to 2003.
Specific examples of floods are:

 In November 1990, flooding caused over $20 million in damage and the closure of the Trans-Canada Highway for 26 hours. 
 In November 1995, flooding caused $4 million in damage in Whatcom County.
 During a November 2006storm, the river flooded the city of Everson. 
 In November and December 2021, water from the Nooksack River filled the Sumas Prairie in Canada's Fraser Valley. This resulted in  evacuations because of a landslide, $1 billion in damage in Abbotsford, British Columbia, and further damage elsewhere.

Both the USA and Canada have faced long-term political hurdles to adequate flood prevention. "On the Washington side, there has been a reluctance to spend money to benefit Canada", and on the Canadian side, "B.C. has been reluctant to use the International Joint Commission following a 1988 report that resulted in the cancellation of the Sage Creek coal mine on the Flathead River".

See also 
 List of rivers of Washington

References

Lynden, Washington
Nooksack
Rivers of Washington (state)
Geography of Bellingham, Washington
Rivers of Whatcom County, Washington